Stephen Nicol (born 11 December 1961) is a Scottish football player, coach and pundit. Nicol mainly played as a right back and occasionally played in other positions across defence and midfield. He spent most of his playing career with the successful Liverpool teams of the 1980s. He was also a regular member of the Scotland national team and represented his country at the 1986 FIFA World Cup.

Nicol started his playing career with local club Ayr United, moving to Liverpool in 1981. He won five English league championships, three FA Cup winners medals, and the 1984 European Cup during 14 years with Liverpool. Nicol played for several other English teams after leaving Liverpool, including Notts County, Sheffield Wednesday and Doncaster Rovers, before emigrating to the United States in 1999. He was most recently coach of the New England Revolution and was the longest-tenured head coach in MLS to coach a single club. Nicol is now a commentator for ESPN FC.

Club career

Ayr United
Nicol began his career with Troon Thistle at age 9, then joined Ayr United at age 16, and started playing for the first team in 1979, where he spent just over two seasons with the Scottish side, racking up 70 league appearances, before Liverpool manager Bob Paisley decided to pay what turned out to be a bargain price, £300,000, to bring Nicol to Anfield on 26 October 1981.

Liverpool
Nicol, who was signed by Bob Paisley, had to wait almost an entire year to make his senior debut for Liverpool and two years for a regular first team place, arriving at the club halfway through a 20-year period of resurgence. 

He made his Reds debut on 31 August 1982 in a 0–0 league draw with Birmingham City at St Andrew's and made a further three league appearances that season. The Reds finished as league champions for the 14th time, but Nicol did not make enough appearances to collect a title winner's medal.

Nicol became a regular in the 1983–84 season under new boss Joe Fagan. He also scored his first goal for the club on 22 October 1983, in a 1–0 league victory over Queens Park Rangers at Loftus Road. He went on to win a League championship medal by the end of his first full season, having not appeared enough times the previous season to qualify for a medal. However, he was not picked for the League Cup final victory over fierce Merseyside derby rivals Everton in the first-ever all-Merseyside final. He came on as a substitute for Craig Johnston in the European Cup final against Roma in the Stadio Olimpico, Rome. After a 1-1 draw, the match went to a penalty shootout. Nicol missed his spot-kick, but Roma failed to score two of their penalties and Liverpool won the competition.

Nicol became a first-team regular for many subsequent seasons, winning the league championship and FA Cup "double" in 1986 under the guidance of Kenny Dalglish, pipping Everton to the title by just two points and then beating them 3–1 in the first-ever all Merseyside FA Cup final. He was also settling into an international career, which would ultimately yield 27 caps and a place in the 1986 FIFA World Cup in Mexico, with Scotland. A versatile player, he played most often at right back following the departure of Phil Neal in 1985, though he also featured at left back, in the centre of defence and as a midfield player. He even played up front on a couple of occasions. He earned the nickname 'Chopsy' because of how he pronounced the word 'chips'.

In the 1987–88 season, he was in a good goal scoring form, despite playing in a position not naturally conducive to attacking. This form included a memorable hat-trick at Newcastle United and a phenomenal long-range header at Arsenal. Nicol's defensive qualities were also much admired as Liverpool coasted to the league title, but missed out on another "double" when Wimbledon surprisingly beat them 1–0 in the FA Cup final at Wembley. Nicol was the last Liverpool player to have a chance to equalise and force extra-time, but his diving header in injury time flew narrowly over the crossbar.

A year later, Nicol played his part as Liverpool won the FA Cup against Everton, winning 3–2 after extra time, but lost the League title in a decider against Arsenal with virtually the last kick of the season. The campaign ended on a personal high for Nicol as he was named Footballer of the Year by football writers.

Nicol accompanied his teammates to many of the funerals and memorial services of the 96 fans who died at the Hillsborough disaster. Like many others in the Liverpool squad, Hillsborough was the second tragedy Nicol had witnessed. Four years earlier, just before the 1985 European Cup final at the Heysel Stadium, Brussels, Liverpool fans had charged a section of, mainly, Juventus supporters, causing a retaining wall to collapse, killing 39 people. As a result of the Heysel disaster, a five-year ban was placed on English clubs in European competitions, with Liverpool being banned for six years. Nicol would be one of the few players still with Liverpool when their ban from European competitions was finally lifted.

When Liverpool beat Crystal Palace 9–0 during the 1989–90 season to accumulate the club's biggest-ever League victory, Nicol was the only player to score twice, getting the first and last goals of the game in the seventh and 90th minutes. Liverpool regained the league title that season – their last until 2019-20 – and, two years later, Nicol was in the team which, under Graeme Souness, won the FA Cup again in 1992, this time beating Sunderland 2–0.

He remained a regular player for Liverpool until the start of the 1994–95 season, when he was forced onto the sidelines with the arrival of new defenders Phil Babb and John Scales. His final appearance for the club was a League Cup tie against Burnley in October 1994.

In 13 years at Anfield, he had played a total of 343 league games and scored 36 goals. At the time of leaving, he was the club's most senior player in terms of unbroken service. Although Ian Rush had joined the club more than a year before Nicol, Rush's service had been disrupted by a year-long spell at Juventus.

Notts County
Nicol stayed at Liverpool until 20 January 1995 when he took on a player-assistant coach role at Notts County after being recruited by County's former Everton manager Howard Kendall. He stayed at Meadow Lane for just 10 months, playing 32 times. After Kendall was sacked, Nicol received his first taste of management when he took charge of the club with two other players for the final months of the Magpies' disastrous 1994–95 campaign. But his efforts were not enough to save Notts County from relegation to Division Two.

Sheffield Wednesday
Following the end of the season, Nicol next moved to Sheffield Wednesday in November 1995, where he made his debut against former derby rivals Everton at Goodison Park on 25 November in a game which ended in a 2–2 draw. However, probably Nicol's best memory of his time at Hillsborough happened on 7 December 1996 when his Wednesday side traveled to his old stomping ground of Anfield. The Sheffield side completely nullified the Liverpool attack, which contained the likes of Robbie Fowler, Steve McManaman and John Barnes, and came away with a 1–0 victory with Nicol playing a major part in the Wednesday defence.

English lower divisions, move to America
Nicol went on to make 49 league appearances before spending a spell on loan at West Bromwich Albion during the 1997–98 season where he played nine games. He then had a short spell with Doncaster Rovers before heading to the U.S. to take a player-coach position with the Boston Bulldogs of the A-League in 1999.

In September of that year, he took over as interim player-coach (he did not make any playing appearances) with the New England Revolution of Major League Soccer for the final two games of the season, winning both. He returned to the Boston Bulldogs as player-coach for the 2000 and 2001 seasons before re-joining the Revs in 2002 as an assistant coach.

International career
Nicol was first capped at the senior level for Scotland on 12 September 1984, soon after becoming a first team regular for Liverpool. Jock Stein gave Nicol his international debut in a friendly with Yugoslavia. His debut was a memorable one, as he helped Scotland beat Yugoslavia 6–1 in a friendly at Hampden Park in front of a crowd of 18,512. Helping Nicol settle in with the national team were club mates Kenny Dalglish and captain Graeme Souness, who both scored. The last of his 27 full caps for Scotland came on 11 September 1991 in a 2–2 draw in Switzerland during the Euro 92 qualifiers. He was in Scotland's squad for the 1986 World Cup.

Coaching career
In 2002, Nicol took over as head coach of the New England Revolution on an interim basis initially, then permanently after 21 games, leading the team to the MLS Cup final that season and was named MLS Coach of the Year in his first year. The team advanced to the MLS Eastern Conference Finals every year during his tenure until 2008 and returned to the MLS Cup final in 2005, 2006 and 2007. Nicol's Revolution had the unique distinction of not scoring a goal in regulation time in the first three of their four final appearances (losing all four). On 24 October 2011, Nicol and the Revolution mutually decided to part ways, ending his 10-season tenure.

Honours

Player
Liverpool
Football League First Division: 1983–84, 1985–86, 1987–88, 1989–90
FA Cup: 1985–86, 1988–89, 1991–92
FA Charity Shield: 1989
European Cup: 1983–84
Football League Super Cup: 1985–86
Dubai Super Cup: 1986–87

Manager
New England Revolution
North American SuperLiga: 2008
US Open Cup: 2007

Individual
PFA Team of the Year: 1988–89 First Division
Football Writers' Association Footballer of the Year: 1989
MLS Coach of the Year Award: 2002

Career statistics

International

See also
List of Major League Soccer coaches

References

External links
LFCHistory.net profile

Liverpool seasonal record (part 1) 1981/82-1985/86 at sporting-heroes.net
Liverpool seasonal record (part 2) 1981-1990 at sporting-heroes.net
Liverpool seasonal record (part 3) 1990/91-1994/95 at sporting-heroes.net
Sheffield Wednesday seasonal record 1995/96-1997/98 at sporting-heroes.net
Profile of Nicol from Soccer New England

1961 births
Living people
People from Troon
Scottish footballers
Association football defenders
Scotland international footballers
Scotland under-21 international footballers
1986 FIFA World Cup players
Premier League players
English Football League players
National League (English football) players
A-League (1995–2004) players
FA Cup Final players
Ayr United F.C. players
Liverpool F.C. players
Notts County F.C. players
Sheffield Wednesday F.C. players
West Bromwich Albion F.C. players
Doncaster Rovers F.C. players
Boston Bulldogs (soccer) players
Scottish football managers
Notts County F.C. managers
New England Revolution coaches
People educated at Marr College
Player-coaches
Footballers from South Ayrshire
Outfield association footballers who played in goal
Scottish expatriate footballers
Scottish expatriate football managers
Scottish expatriate sportspeople in the United States
Expatriate soccer managers in the United States
Expatriate soccer players in the United States